A constitutional referendum was held in Rhodesia on 30 January 1979. It followed the Internal Settlement drawn up between Prime Minister Ian Smith and Abel Muzorewa, leader of the non-violent UANC. The new constitution would bring in black majority rule in the country, which would be renamed Zimbabwe Rhodesia. The settlement was supported by the ruling Rhodesian Front, but opposed by the Rhodesian Action Party, which had broken away from the Front.

The referendum was open only to white voters, passing by 85%. Voter turnout was 71.5%.

Despite the transition to majority rule following elections in April, the country remained unrecognised by the international community, and the Patriotic Front parties continued the Bush War until the signing of the Lancaster House Agreement and fresh elections in 1980.

Results

References

1979 referendums
1979 constitutional referendum
Constitutional referendum
1979 elections in Africa
Constitutional referendums in Zimbabwe